"Shut Up!" is a song by Canadian rock band Simple Plan for their second studio album, Still Not Getting Any... (2004). Released in January 2005, "Shut Up!" stalled at number 99 on the US Billboard Hot 100 but was more successful internationally, charting at number three in Sweden and reaching the top 20 in Australia and New Zealand. Simple Plan performed this song on the 2005 Kids' Choice Awards, as a way to promote the album.

Music video
The video starts out with the band members walking down the street, into the Millennium Biltmore Hotel in downtown Los Angeles. Once inside, they walk into the ballroom, where there is a fancy party going on. Grabbing their instruments, they start playing, creating a huge disturbance. The party goers begin to get very upset, as the members of Simple Plan begin jumping on tables and destroying everything. This is where Pierre Bouvier first does his knee dance. As some of the younger members of the party begin to start getting into it, the band's manager leans towards Bouvier and says "Dude, there's been a major mix up." Pierre asks "Are we in the wrong place?" and, upon confirmation, exclaims "I thought something was up!" The video then goes through a fast motion rewind, and ends up in a club, where the remainder of the song is played.

Track listings

UK and Australian CD single
 "Shut Up!" (album version)
 "Welcome to My Life" (acoustic)
 "I'd Do Anything" (live from Burning Van)

European CD single
 "Shut Up!" (album version)
 "Welcome to My Life" (acoustic)

European DVD single
 "Shut Up!" (album version)
 "Shut Up!" (Dolby 5.1 Surround mix)
 "Shut Up!" (video)
 "Simple Plan EPK" (video)

Charts

Weekly charts

Year-end charts

Certifications

Release history

References

Simple Plan songs
2004 songs
2005 singles
Lava Records singles
Music videos directed by Erik White
Song recordings produced by Bob Rock
Songs written by Chuck Comeau
Songs written by Pierre Bouvier